There are at least 42 named mountains in Big Horn County, Montana.
 Abbots Urn, el. 
 Battle Ridge, el. 
 Black Gulch Point, el. 
 Buffalo Jump, el. 
 Buffalo Jump, el. 
 Busby Butte, el. 
 Calhoun Hill, el. 
 Castle Rock, el. 
 Chalk Butte, el. 
 Crown Butte, el. 
 Dead Indian Hill, el. 
 Eagle Butte, el. 
 Eagle Nest Peak, el. 
 Eagle Point, el. 
 Gracy Butte, el. 
 Grapevine Dome, el. 
 Half Moon Hill, el. 
 Hampton Butte, el. 
 Haystack Butte, el. 
 Haystack Butte, el. 
 Hellers Peak, el. 
 Hive Butte, el. 
 Horn Mountain, el. 
 Last Stand Hill, el. 
 Mission Buttes, el. 
 Old Flat Top, el. 
 Painted Hill, el. 
 Peyote Point, el. 
 Point Lookout, el. 
 Rattlesnake Butte, el. 
 Red Butte, el. 
 Red Hill, el. 
 Red Hills, el. 
 Sarpy Mountains, el. 
 Shortys Hill, el. 
 The Mesa, el. 
 The Pyramid, el. 
 Twin Peaks, el. 
 Walker Hill, el. 
 War Man Mountain, el. 
 Weir Point, el. 
 West Pryor Mountain, el.

See also
 List of mountains in Montana
 List of mountain ranges in Montana

Notes

Landforms of Big Horn County, Montana
Big Horn